Zaripov (Cyrillic: Зарипов) is an Asian masculine surname, its feminine counterpart is Zaripova. The surname may refer to the following notable people: 
Amina Zaripova (born 1976), Russian rhythmic gymnast
Danis Zaripov (born 1981), Russian ice hockey left winger 
Hakim Zaripov (1924–2023), Uzbek circus performer
Irek Zaripov, Russian biathlete and cross-country skier
Kamila Zaripova (born 1998), Uzbekistani football midfielder
Nizoramo Zaripova (born 1923), Tajik-Soviet stateswoman, politician and women's rights advocate
Rail Zaripov (born 1995), Russian football player
Ramil Zaripov (born 1992), Russian football defender
Rina Zaripova (1941–2008), Tatar journalist, translator and teacher
Venera Zaripova (born 1966), Soviet rhythmic gymnast
Yuliya Zaripova (born 1986), Russian middle-distance runner